French language became an international language in the Middle Ages, when the power of the Kingdom of France made it the second international language, alongside Latin. This status continued to grow into the 18th century, by which time French was the language of European diplomacy and international relations.    

According to the 2022 report of the Organisation internationale de la Francophonie (OIF), 409 million people speak French. The OIF states that despite a decline in the number of learners of French in Europe, the overall number of speakers is rising, largely because of its presence in African countries: of the 212 million who use French daily, 54.7% are living in Africa. The OIF figures have been contested as being inflated due to the methodology used and its overly broad definition of the word francophone. According to the authors of a 2017 book on the world distribution of the French language, a credible estimate of the number of "francophones réels" (real francophones), that is, individuals who speak French on a daily basis either as their mother tongue or as a second language, would be around 130 million.

Statistics

OIF figures

The following figures are from a 2022 report of the Organisation internationale de la Francophonie (OIF). No distinctions are made between native speakers of French and those who learnt it as a foreign language, between different levels of mastery or how often the language is used in daily life. For African countries where French is the main language of education, the number of French speakers is derived from the average number of schooling years.

Other territories

Native speakers
It is estimated that 80 million people worldwide speak French as a main or first language.

Subnational territories

Africa

Northern Africa

Algeria

In Algeria, 69.1% of the population over 15 in Alger, Constantine, Oran and Annaba can read and write French. According to a survey conducted in 2012, fewer than four in 10 Algerians identified with a Francophone identity. Conversely, speaking French was seen as essential by seven in 10, though a third of the population felt that the use of French is declining. In urban areas, the ability to speak fluent French is considered almost mandatory to find employment, especially in specialized white collar fields. French is the first foreign language in Algeria, and is introduced at the primary level. In higher education, French is the language of instruction in scientific and technical fields.

Francophone Algerians can be divided into three broad categories: 'real Francophones', who speak French as part of their daily lives and mostly come from a privileged background; 'casual Francophones', who use the language in certain contexts, alternating it with Arabic, and 'passive Francophones', who can understand French but do not speak it.

French television channels are widely watched in Algeria, and Algerian newspapers print their television schedules. Algeria also has a sizeable French-language press. A 2014 report published by the National Assembly of France describes it as the most important French-speaking country after France. Nevertheless, Algeria is not a member of the Francophonie. On social media, French was used on Facebook by 76% of Algerians in 2014.

French is not official, but The World Factbook cites it as the lingua franca of the country. The French language, restricted to an urban elite during the colonial period, began to expand as part of the mass education efforts launched after 1962. Its controversial status as a legacy of colonialism led to the increasing Arabisation of the school system in the 1970s and 1980s. The usage of French in the country reached its lowest point during the Algerian Civil War in the 1990s, when armed Islamist groups targeted teachers of French. The language has rebounded in public life since the end of the war, culminating in the efforts to reintroduce French in primary schools in 2006, which were initially hampered by a lack of sufficiently qualified teachers. Referring to the continued usage of French in Algeria in the post-colonial period, the writer Kateb Yacine described the French language as the 'spoils of war' (butin de guerre) of Algerians.

Local French-language media include El Watan, Le Soir d'Algérie, Liberté, Le Matin and Tout sur l'Algérie. According to a 2010 study by IMMAR Research & Consultancy, Francophone newspapers had a readership of 4,459,000 in the country, or 28% of the total, and a majority among readers with a high school or university education.

Egypt
The first French-medium school was established in Egypt in 1836, and the importance of French expanded throughout the second half of the 19th century, until it became the most common foreign language in the country. At the time, it was also a lingua franca for the communities of foreign origin, especially in Cairo.

During the period of the British colonization of Egypt French was actually the medium of communication among foreigners and between foreigners and Egyptians; the mixed French-Egyptian civil courts operated in French, and government notices from the Egyptian Sultan, taxi stand information, timetables of trains, and other legal documents were issued in French. This was partly because of some Egyptians had French education and partly because of cultural influence from France. Despite efforts from British legal personnel, English was never adopted as a language of the Egyptian civil courts during the period of British influence.

French began to lose ground in Egyptian society in the 1920s for a number of political and social reasons; from the 1930s onwards English became the main foreign language, but French was still being learnt by 8 million Egyptians in 2013. There are two French-speaking universities in the country, the Université Française d'Égypte and the Université Senghor.

French is spoken by elderly people in the educated class who are over 40 years old. These people are more eloquent in this language because French was the main language used in education many years back before English prevailed and became the most preferred language of teaching. French is, however, starting to gain more prevalence as many young people are now attending French schools compared to before. As a result of this, the number of young people speaking French has risen to match those speaking English.

Mauritania

French was demoted from its status as an official language of Mauritania in 1991. Even so, it is taught from the second grade onward for up to six hours a week. French is also a language of instruction in high school for scientific subjects. In higher education, 2,300 students were enrolled in French courses in 2012. French remains, alongside Arabic, the language of work and education, although there were attempts to introduce English as a first foreign language. On social media, 59% of Mauritanian Facebook users used French on the website in 2014.

Morocco

The 2004 census of Morocco found that 39.5% of the population aged 10 and older could read and write French. Spoken mainly in cities among the upper middle class, French is the medium of instruction of two-thirds of courses in higher education, including science and technology, health, economics and management, although the adoption of English for this role was being considered by the Minister of Education. In the private sector, French is treated as more than simply a foreign language. French is introduced in primary school, where it is studied for up to 7 hours a week. It is also used as the language of education in many private schools. Moroccans are the largest group of foreign students in France, ahead of the Chinese and Algerians.

50.3% of the population over 15 in Tanger, Fès, Rabat, Casablanca and Marrakech can read and write French. According to a survey conducted in 2012, just a third of urban Moroccans identify with a Francophone identity, and slightly more wish for French to become more commonly used. French is nevertheless deemed essential, both in the professional and private spheres, by three-quarters of respondents. French-language media are losing ground to Arabic media, including in television, radio or the press: of 618 Moroccan publications in 2004, 448 were in Arabic and 164 in French. On social media, French was used on Facebook by 75% of Moroccans in 2014.

Local French-language media include Le Matin du Sahara et du Maghreb, TelQuel, Aujourd'hui le Maroc, La Vie éco.

Tunisia

French is a working language in many sectors in Tunisia, including healthcare, commerce or communication. In coastal areas and the more developed neighbourhoods of the capital, it is also a common language of communication for all social groups, either in its standardised form or hybridised with Arabic. In the inland regions and the south it remains a foreign language. French is introduced from the third grade at 8 hours per week. In high school French is the language of instruction for mathematics, science and computing. Teachers are not always sufficiently trained for this usage, however.

Nearly three-quarters of the population of Tunis, Sousse and Sfax consider French as essential in their professional or personal lives. However, only half of the population feels Francophone, and only a third feels solidarity with other Francophone countries. 70.8% of the population over 15 in the aforementioned Tunisians cities can read and write French. Arabic increasingly dominates the Tunisian media landscape, especially on television: the audience share of local French-language channels reached 25% in the early 1990s, but hardly reached 3% by the 2010s. On social media, French was used on Facebook by 91% of Tunisians in 2014.

Local French-language media include La Presse de Tunisie, L'Economiste Maghrébin, Tunivisions, Le Temps.

Sub-Saharan Africa

According to the High Council of the International Organization of the Francophonie, in 2010, 96.2 million French speakers were living in various countries in Africa. French has been imported to most of these countries through colonization, and it is not a mother tongue to most residents. African standards of French differ from European ones. Some linguists discuss a "second French language" or even an "African French language".

According to Paul Wald, "The notion of ownership of an imported language begins when – despite its identification as a foreign and/or vernacular language – its use does not imply a relationship with the foreigner." French can thus be considered the result of functional and vernacular ownerships, satisfying the needs of a society with new sociocultural and socioeconomic realities. French has begun developing into almost independent varieties, with creation of different types of slang by speakers with a sufficient knowledge of French. Examples include the Ivorian jargon "Nouchi" in Abidjan and the Cameroonian "Camfranglais", which is a mixture of French and English with elements of indigenous languages.

Benin

French is the sole official language of Benin. According to a 2014 survey, 57.3% of residents of Cotonou over the age of 15 could read and write French. Knowledge of French is considered important for employment, bureaucracy, education but also in everyday life. 34% of the population was Francophone in 2002, up from 23% in 1992. There are strong regional differences, with the ability to speak French being more common in the south of the country. The Atlantique and Littoral departments have a French-speaking majority. French speakers are more commonly men than women, owing to a disparity in access to education.

Burkina Faso

French is the sole official language of Burkina Faso. In Ouagadougou, 49.4% of the population aged 15 and older can read and write French. At the national level French was the first language for 1.66% of the population in 2006 (up from 0.75% in 1996), reaching 9.54% in the capital, where it is the second most spoken language, behind Dioula.

Burundi

Until 2014, French was one of two official languages of Burundi, the other being Kirundi., Only Kirundi is spoken by the vast majority of the population, therefore holding the status of national language as determined by article 5 of the Constitution.

Cameroon

French is one of two official languages of Cameroon, the other being English. French is the main language in eight of the ten regions of the country, with English being dominant in the remaining two. French is the mother tongue of a vast proportion of young Cameroonians living in urban centers. In Cameroon, 63.7% of the population aged 15 and older in Douala and 60.5% in Yaoundé can read and write French; an additional 13–15% can speak French without being able to write it. To some extent, the language situation in Cameroon between French and English could be described fairly accurately as an exact inversion of the linguistic situation existing in Canada between English and French : Being spoken by 80% of the educated population (unlike English which is much less spoken), French predominates largely especially in government and information, even in English-speaking regions, which has led to the current uprising of the English-speaking minority living at the Nigerian border, which complains that English language is disappearing progressively under the pressure of the more numerous French speakers and that the linguistic rights of the English speakers are not respected, endangering their specific culture.

Central African Republic

French is an official language of the Central African Republic along with Sango.

Chad

French is one of two official languages of Chad, together with Arabic. Half of the residents of N'Djamena  feel solidarity towards other French-speaking countries and wishes for the use of French to expand. French is seen as important in work and education. French shares a place with Arabic as the language of administration and education, as well as in the press; French is dominant on radio and television. French is also spoken as part of daily life.

Comoros

French is one of two official languages of Comoros, Arabic being the second. On social media, French was used on Facebook by 100% of Comorians in 2014.

Congo-Brazzaville

French is the sole official language of Republic of Congo. 68.7% of the population of Brazzaville aged 15 and older can read and write French. French is the main language in the media, used by 63% of radio and television broadcasters. French is also the dominant language in the state administrations.

Congo-Kinshasa

French is the sole official language of Democratic Republic of Congo. About half of Kinshasa residents feel solidarity towards Francophone countries, and French is seen as important for education and relations with the government. It is also seen as important to be successful in life, along with English. French is the main language of education after third grade.

Djibouti

French is one of two official languages of Djibouti, the other being Arabic. On social media, French was used on Facebook by 82% of Djiboutians in 2014.

Gabon

French is the sole official language of Gabon. According to a 1999 survey, French was the first language for 26.3% of Libreville residents between the age of 15 and 25. 71.9% of the capital's residents over 15 years of age could read and write French. Three quarters of the population of the capital identifies as Francophone and considers French as essential. All local publications are in French.

Guinea

French is the sole official language of Guinea. In Conakry, 42.1% of the population aged 15 and older can read and write French.

Ivory Coast

French is the sole official language of the Ivory Coast. In Abidjan, largest city of the country, 57.6% of the inhabitants over 15 can read and write French, and another 11% can speak it but not write it. The French language is seen as essential by a large majority, especially for dealing with the government and in education. Two thirds of respondents report feeling Francophone. French plays an important role in all areas of public and private life across the whole country. French is increasingly seen as an Ivorian language, and a local variety distinct from standard French has emerged.

Madagascar

In Antananarivo, the capital of Madagascar, French is seen as important for work, education and administrative matters, but not in everyday life, where Malagasy dominates. Less than half feel solidarity with other Francophone countries or consider knowledge of French as essential. Education in primary schools is bilingual in Malagasy and French. The latter is used as medium of education for mathematics and scientific subjects. French is the language of instruction in secondary and tertiary education. It is also the main language of government, alongside Malagasy.

Mali

In Bamako, 47.7% of the population over 15 can read and write French. Only 5 out of 10 people in the capital feel solidarity towards Francophone countries. French, however, is seen as essential for work, studies and administrative procedures. French is advancing as a second language, rising from 11.9% in 1987 to 24.4% in 2009, but declining as a native language from 0.11% of the population in 1987 to 0.09% in 1998, losing some ground to Bambara. French is more widely spoken in the Sahel region in the north of the country than in the south.

Mauritius

Niger

French is the sole official language of Niger. In Niamey, the capital, French is seen as essential for work, studies and administrative procedures. Two-thirds of residents believe that the use of French is becoming more common in the country.

Rwanda

French became the administrative language of Rwanda in 1916. The Genocide against the Tutsi in 1994 and the victory of the Rwandan Patriotic Front were followed by a period of linguistic upheaval, with the return of refugees from Anglophone countries setting the stage for the officialisation of English in 1996 and the gradual usurpation of French as the language of education, culminating in the decision in October 2008 to make English the main language of education at higher levels, effectively relegating French to the status of third language. Nevertheless, a survey of students in Kigali found that French was known by a majority of them.

Senegal

French is the sole official language of Senegal. French was commonly spoken by 9.4% of Senegalese in 2002, mainly as a second language, with just 0.6% speaking it natively. Wolof is by far the most spoken language in the country, including the capital, while French remains a second language, becoming the main language only in non-Wolof areas. French is the main language of institutions, however. Only half of Dakar residents identify with a Francophone status or feel solidarity with French-speaking countries, but the French language is seen as essential for everyday affairs and education.

French was the language of literacy for 37.2% of the population in 2013, followed by Arabic at 11.1%. French is the main language of education in all regions of Senegal except for Kaffrine, where Arabic remains dominant, with significant Arabic-educated minorities in Kaolack (15.9% to 33.0% for French), Louga (15.8% to 22.7%) and Diourbel (15.0% to 17.2%). This phenomenon is explained by the impact of Quranic schools or Daara in those regions.

Seychelles

Togo

French is the sole official language of Togo. According to the 2010 census, 53% of the population over the age of 15 can read and write French.

Americas

Caribbean

French language is spoken in the overseas departments of French Guiana and the French Antilles, including Guadeloupe, Martinique, and the islands formerly attached to Guadeloupe. There are over a million people living in these departments and collectivities.

French Creoles are also spoken on the islands of Dominica, St. Lucia, and to a more limited extent, Grenada.

Haiti

French is one of two official languages of Haiti, together with Haitian Creole, which is French-based. French is the language of culture and business in Haiti, and also the main language of institutions. French is used most by the elite and the middle class. Attempts to increase the legitimacy of Creole as an official language and in the media, on radio and television in particular, led to a relative decline in the share of French usage. Most teachers of French suffer from a low level of skills in the language, with nearly 85% achieving a level between A2 and B1 in the Test de connaissance du français (TCF) in 2009.

North America

Canada

French is the second most common language in Canada, after English, which are the two official languages of the Canadian federation. About 6,827,860 Canadians speak French as their first language, or around 20% of the country, with 2,065,300 constituting secondary speakers. Bilingualism with French has been declining in English Canada in recent years.

Provincially, French is the sole official language of the Province of Quebec, being the mother tongue for some 7 million people, or almost 80.1 percent (2006 Census) of the province. About 95 percent of the people of Quebec speak French as either a first or second language. English and French are the official languages of New Brunswick, where bilingualism is constitutionally and statutorily enacted. In 2016, approximately 32 per cent of New Brunswick claims French as their mother tongue. More than three-quarters of francophones in New Brunswick resides in the eastern portion of the province. English and French are also constitutionally recognized as the official languages of Manitoba's legislative and judicial branches. In 2016, more than 43,000 Manitobans (3.4 per cent of the province's population) claims French as their mother tongue.  Franco-Manitobans are primarily concentrated in southern Manitoba, along corridors that follows the Seine and the Red River of the North; with 80 per cent of Franco-Manitobans residing in Eastman or the Winnipeg Capital Region.

French is also an official language of all three territories (Northwest Territories, Nunavut, and Yukon), along with English and, in Northwest Territories and Nunavut, multiple Aboriginal languages. Out of the three, Yukon has the most French speakers, comprising just under 4 per cent of the population. 

French is also an official language of Ontario's legislature and judiciary, with access to a French judiciary being viewed as quasi-constitutional right in that province. French language rights are also statutorily enacted to certain regions of Ontario, under the French Language Services Act. More than 600,000 francophones reside in Ontario (approximately 4.7 per cent of the population), constituting the largest French-speaking community in Canada outside Quebec. Over 40 per cent of Franco-Ontarians reside in Eastern Ontario, with more than half of that population living in communities close to the Ontario-Quebec border. Central and northeastern Ontario also holds significant populations of Franco-Ontarians, with francophones making up over 22 per cent of northeastern Ontario's population.

United States

According to the U.S. Census Bureau (2011), French is the fourth most-spoken language in the United States after English, Spanish, and Chinese, when all forms of French are considered together and all languages of Chinese are similarly combined. French remains the second most-spoken language in the states of Louisiana, Maine, Vermont and New Hampshire.

Louisiana is home to many distinct dialects, collectively known as Louisiana French. Cajun French has the largest number of speakers, mostly living in Acadiana. According to the 2000 United States Census, there are over 194,000 people in Louisiana who speak French at home, the most of any state if Louisiana Creole is excluded. In October 2018, Louisiana became the first U.S. state to join the Organisation Internationale de la Francophonie. New England French, essentially a variant of Canadian French, is spoken in parts of New England.

Missouri French, Muskrat French and Métis French were historically spoken by descendants of habitants, voyageurs and coureurs des bois in various parts of New France, but are now endangered languages.

South America

Argentina
See French Argentines

Brazil
The anti-Portuguese factor of Brazilian nationalism in the 19th century led to an increased use of the French language to the detriment of Portuguese, as France was seen at the time as a model of civilization and progress. The learning of French has historically been important and strong among the Lusophone high societies, and for a great span of time, it was also the main foreign language among the middle class of both Portugal and Brazil, but now trails English, in both, and more recently, Spanish, in the latter.

Asia

Myanmar
In Myanmar, French is gaining popularity amongst university students and the tourism sector, as the country slowly opens up. French is taught in secondary school, as with other foreign languages aside from English, which is taught from primary school. Two universities in the country have French-language departments, for a total of 350 students.

Cambodia

About 3% of the population of Cambodia can speak French as of 2014.

China
In China the language was also spoken by the elite in the Shanghai French Concession and other concessions in Guangzhou (Shamian Island), Hankou, Tianjin, Kwang-Chou-Wan and in the French zone of influence over the provinces of Yunnan, Guangxi, Hainan, and Guangdong. French is seen as important for doing business in Africa in particular, and 6,000 students attended French courses in 2013. 29,000 study French in one of the Alliance française establishments, and 20,000 more study it in private language schools or academies, while 35,000 Chinese people are studying in France.

India
French is used as the official language in areas of Pondicherry, Karikal and Chandannagar as they were former French colonies.

Jordan

French is a minor language in Jordan brought over by French colonists in Lebanon and Syria and Maghrebi and French expatriates. The growth of French in Jordan occurred primarily in the 20th century but it is still popular today. Amman is home to the Lycée Français, while the Institut français de Jordanie is another important Francophone institution in the country. According to the 2014 Francophonie report, 12,000 Jordanians were studying French at the primary level, 30,000 at the secondary level and 1,747 in universities.

Lebanon

As the Lebanese people historically call France la tendre mère (English: The Tender Mother), not only is speaking French in Lebanon common and encouraged, but it is also a self-identification with the French liberal and cultural spirit that was mainly the result of the French colonial period and educational, Christian religious and governmental enterprises. However, most Lebanese privilege French out of fascination and infatuation with the culture, not for any functional purposes.

While the Article 11 of Lebanon's Constitution states that "Arabic is the official national language, a law determines the cases in which the French language is to be used".

Today, French and English are secondary languages of Lebanon, with about 40% of the population being Francophone and 40% Anglophone. The use of English is growing in the business and media environment. Out of about 900,000 students, about 500,000 are enrolled in Francophone schools, public or private, in which the teaching of mathematics and scientific subjects is provided in French. Actual usage of French varies depending on the region and social status. One third of high school students educated in French go on to pursue higher education in English-speaking institutions. English is the language of business and communication, with French being an element of social distinction, chosen for its emotional value. On social media, French was used on Facebook by just 10% of Lebanese in 2014, far behind English (78%).

Laos

About 3% of the population of Laos can speak French as of 2014.

Philippines
The Philippines has become one of the most active areas where French is being studied. Home of the first Alliance Française in the Southeast Asia (founded in 1912), it continues to educate many Filipinos and expatriates in the said language. There are currently two branches of Alliance Française in the Philippines, that of Manila and Cebu.

Although the language is not offered in elementary school, President Gloria Macapagal Arroyo issued a proclamation encouraging the language to be an elective in high school. Also, French, along with Spanish, is a popular foreign language offered in many universities in the country. The University of the Philippines offers a bachelor's degree in European Languages, where French is one of the possible majors.

Singapore
In Singapore, the top 10% of Primary School Leaving Examination graduates may choose to opt for French as a second or third language in secondary school, though the language is not an official language in Singapore, and is not commonly spoken among locals.

Syria
Syria, as well as Lebanon were French League of Nations Mandates following World War I, which put French language as one of the main official language in Syria. Following independence, French was demoted as the official language of Syria, but it remained taught alongside English in schools as the second foreign language. French remains widely spoken among intellectuals and members of the upper class in Syria and most educated Syrians are trilingual, speaking Arabic, English and French.

French is mostly popular in the cities of Damascus and Aleppo where the Lycée Français Charles de Gaulle and l’École Française, Syria's only two French schools, are located respectively. In 2016, a new French school opened in Tartous increasing the total number to three.

Vietnam

About 0.7% of the population of Vietnam can speak French as of 2014.

Europe

Spoken by 12% of the EU population, French is the second most widely spoken mother tongue in the European Union, after German; it is also the third most widely known language of the Union, after English and German (33% of the EU population report to know how to speak English, whilst 22% of Europeans understand German and 20% French).

Andorra

Belgium

In Belgium, French is an official language in Wallonia and Brussels. French is the primary language of Wallonia (excluding a part of the East Cantons, which are German-speaking) and in the Brussels-Capital Region, where it is spoken by the majority of the population often as their primary language. In the Flemish Region French is not an official language, with the exception of a dozen municipalities with language facilities for French speakers along borders with the Walloon and Brussels-Capital regions.

In total, native French speakers make up about 38% of the country's population. Including speakers of French as a second language, about 72% of the Belgian population can speak French.

France

French formally became the official language of France in 1992, but the ordinance of Villers-Cotterêts made it mandatory for legal documents in 1539. France mandates the use of French in official government publications and public education except in specific cases (though these dispositions are often ignored) and legal contracts; advertisements must bear a translation of foreign words.

Guernsey

In Guernsey, English is the only official language, although French is sometimes used in legislation with a ceremonial capacity. Nevertheless, Norman (in its local forms, Guernésiais and Jèrriais) is the historical vernacular of the islands.

Italy

The Aosta Valley was the first government authority to adopt Modern French as working language in 1536, three years before France itself. French has been the official language of the Aosta Valley since 1561, when it replaced Latin. In the 1861 census, the first held after the unification of Italy, 93% declared being Francophone; in 1921, the last census with a question about language found that 88% of the population was French-speaking. The suppression of all French-language schools and institutions and violence against French speakers during the forceful Italianisation campaign of the Fascist government irretrievably damaged the status of French in the region. Italian and French are nowadays the region's official languages and are used for the regional government's acts and laws, though Italian is much more widely spoken in everyday life, and French is mostly used within cultural events. Though French was re-introduced as an official language after World War II, and by 2003 just 0.99% reported speaking French natively. French remains widely known as a second language, but it is no longer spoken as part of daily life. In 2001, 75.41% of the Valdostan population declared to know French, 96.01% declared to know Italian, 55.77% Franco-Provençal, and 50.53% all of them. School education is delivered equally in both Italian and French so that everyone who went to school in Aosta Valley can speak French to at least a medium-high level.

Jersey

In Jersey, a standardized variety of French called Jersey Legal French is an official language. However, its use is generally restricted to parliament formalities or legal codes and contracts.

Luxembourg

French is one of three official languages of the Grand Duchy of Luxembourg, alongside German and Luxembourgish, the natively spoken language of Luxembourg. French is primarily used for administrative purposes by the government, is the language in which laws are published since the law of 1984  and is also the primary language used to converse with foreigners. Luxembourg's education system is trilingual: the first cycle of basic school is in Luxembourgish, before changing officially to German for most branches; while in secondary school, the language of instruction changes to French for most subjects, such as mathematics and science. At the Luxembourg University courses are offered in French, German and English.

Switzerland

French is one of the four official languages of Switzerland (along with German, Italian and Romansh) and is spoken in the western part of Switzerland called Romandie, of which Geneva is the largest city. The language divisions in Switzerland do not coincide with political subdivisions and some cantons have bilingual status for example, cities such Biel/Bienne or cantons such as Valais-Fribourg-Berne. French is the native language of about 20% of the Swiss population and is spoken by 50.4% of the population.

United Kingdom

French is the most popular foreign language studied in British schools. According to a 2006 European Commission report, 23% of UK residents are able to carry on a conversation in French. Other surveys put the figure at 15%.

See also
 List of territorial entities where French is an official language
 Organisation internationale de la Francophonie
 Hispanophone

Notes

References

Citations

Sources

External links
 Observatoire démographique et statistique de l’espace francophone (ODSEF)
 Why French Matters
 Is French a Global Language?